Wang Tao (born 13 December 1982) is a Chinese sports shooter. He competed in the Men's 10 metre air rifle event at the 2012 Summer Olympics, finishing in fourth.

References

External links
 

1982 births
Living people
Chinese male sport shooters
Olympic shooters of China
Shooters at the 2012 Summer Olympics
Sport shooters from Hunan
21st-century Chinese people